Carlos Solano Fernández (born 1950 or 1951) is considered one of the best Costa Rican soccer strikers during the 1970s. He played most of his career for Deportivo Saprissa.

Club career
Solano helped Saprissa win several national titles during the 1970s, becoming one of the best goal scorers of the mythical Saprissa team that won six national championships in a row from 1972 to 1977, and was the top scorer in the 1976 national tournament, scoring a total of 49 goals during those six seasons. He is one of few players who scored 5 goals in one Costa Rica Primera División match.

He also played abroad in Honduras, winning another league title, and Guatemala before returning home to finish his career as player/manager of Sagrada Familia.

International career
He played with the Costa Rica national football team during the 1978 FIFA World Cup qualification. He also represented Costa Rica at the 1975 Pan American Games in Mexico.

Retirement
After retiring, Solano ran a sports shop in Siquirres. He appeared in the 2017 film La paisana Jacinta en búsqueda de Wasaberto.

References

Living people
People from Cartago Province
Association football forwards
Costa Rican footballers
Costa Rica international footballers
Deportivo Saprissa players
C.S. Cartaginés players
Real C.D. España players
C.D. Olimpia players
C.D. Suchitepéquez players
A.D. Ramonense players
Costa Rican expatriate footballers
Expatriate footballers in Honduras
Costa Rican expatriate sportspeople in Honduras
Expatriate footballers in Guatemala
Costa Rican expatriate sportspeople in Guatemala
Footballers at the 1975 Pan American Games
Pan American Games competitors for Costa Rica
Year of birth uncertain
Year of birth missing (living people)